Strange World (Original Motion Picture Soundtrack) is the score album to the 2022 computer-animated film Strange World produced by Walt Disney Animation Studios. The original score is composed by Henry Jackman in his fifth scoring assignment for Disney film, after Winnie the Pooh (2011), Wreck-It Ralph (2012), Big Hero 6 (2014) and Ralph Breaks the Internet (2018). Jackman referenced most of James Horner and John Williams' electronic and symphony orchestral score for big-budget films, to create a "larger-than-life and fantastical, but organic" score suiting the world. He relied on orchestral music and harmonies, with exception for electronic and synth-infused score in few sequences.

The original soundtrack, consisted the song "They're The Clades!" composed by Jackman, written by Kevin Del Aguila and performed by James Hayden, also having a reprised version of the tracks. Jackman's score accompanied the remainder of the album. It was released by Walt Disney Records on November 23, 2022, the same day as the film and received generally positive response for Jackman's composition.

Production

Background 
On September 5, 2022, it was announced that Henry Jackman, composer of Big Hero 6 and the Wreck-It Ralph films, would compose the score for Strange World, marking his third collaboration with Don Hall, after Winnie the Pooh and Big Hero 6, and his fifth overall feature-length scoring work with Walt Disney Animation Studios, which includes the Wreck-It Ralph films.

When Jackman was writing the score for The Gray Man (2022), he discussed with Hall on scoring for Strange World, which he simultaneously began after the former's completion. The score depicted a "fantastical, but organic and not so technological world" and a celebration of "symphony orchestra" which extends the color of the musical score. The orchestra, choir and synth-based electronic music brings the music of Strange World, "a bit like augmented reality". While writing the music, Jackman discussed with Hall on the musical references that inspired the score, including John Williams' score for Star Wars (1977), The Empire Strikes Back (1980) and Raiders of the Lost Ark (1981), where it "corresponds to a certain type of action-adventure, a certain use of committed thematic orchestra". Both Hall and Qui Nguyen had inspired Williams and James Horner's work which are referenced throughout the film. Hall called that "This is my favorite score that he's ever done. It's so much a part of the film and evoking what we wanted to evoke, those adventure films from the eighties. Those were the movies that he kept bringing up and felt like that would influence the sound of Strange World."

He wrote four harmonic portions, that had arranged in a series of arpeggios which was a four-chords sequence, adding that "When I first came out with them, I didn’t analyze the harmony, I just wrote them as they came and felt happy with them. And because the four chords themselves were so unusual, when it came to writing a melody, there was only a certain amount of notes that were available to me, and it ended up pushing me into all sorts of unusual dissonances that were still melodic. It felt like beautiful-ish and melodic but also a bit dissonant." Since the theme, were written out of the picture, he wrote it as a three-minute-and-a-half piece cue titled as "Strange World Passacaglia". The arpeggiation of harp strings reminded him of Claude Debussy and Maurice Ravel's composition La mer, as well as the string portions felt like an Austro-Germanic tone poem inspired from Richard Wagner's composition.

As he wrote the cue outside the picture, he used it as the principal leitmotif for the score, which would be used for entities appearing the world. He felt the score is not scary as Alan Silvestri's score for Predator (1987) but odd as a similar to Jerry Goldsmith's Alien (1979) theme. The track "End Credits Suite" is "just every theme in the movie in a swashbuckling, three minute suite". Jackman referenced Williams' Superman theme where "the first thing that happens is you just get a load of swooping credits for about three and a half minutes while John Williams gets to blast through every single tune of "Superman." It's like, we haven't even started yet and we get a full operatic overture." The suite was indeed a "medley of all the themes he had composed", where he added "in this heritage of adventure music, firstly there's incredibly committed thematic material. There's no attempt to sort of be endlessly minimalistic."

Jackman used the 20th century concert music harmony to produce a "slightly Dagobah system" where "strange and otherworldly harmonies that are much closer to concert music". The Avalonia theme, underlies the Clade family’s emotional connection, which Jackman said "is much more the feeling of home and even the instrumentation, there's like a bass player and some guitars and things that. It feels safer and more like home. But you need that as a sort of foil, you need a sense of the safe world before you go on your mad adventure into the unknown." Hence, the first reel of the film, had the theme, which is "more of pop instrumentation and harmony, lesser epic and symphony".

Track listing

Additional music 
The track "Family Ties" by Bastille was featured in the special look trailer. The track were used for promotional purposes, and was none featured in the soundtrack, nor in the film. Additionally, one song featured "Lone Digger" from Caravan Palace in the film, but is not included from the soundtrack.

Reception 
Filmtracks.com wrote "though, it's the main strange world theme summarized in "Strange World Overture" that will tickle the fancy of listeners tired of otherwise effective but mundane children's adventure music. The remaining elements in Strange World are adequate to the task and at times admirable, though the two vocal performances of the Clade theme's song over the opening and closing moments of the film are a tad obnoxious in their intentionally bloated exuberance. Most importantly, Jackman's narrative is extremely well maintained in his themes, and the balance of orchestral and synthetic layers is superb. On the 67-minute, score-only album, a lossless presentation illuminates the intriguing harmonic layers of the strange world theme in ways compressed alternatives cannot. This entry is more intelligent than most of its peers in the genre, a welcome engagement for the mind." Belen Edwards of Mashable wrote "composer Henry Jackman's work tips its dusty fedora to John Williams's classic Indiana Jones theme." Jumpcut Online's "robust musical compositions only adds further to the film’s adventurous side". Devansh Sharma of News9Live said "Henry Jackman's soundtrack, however, isn't as memorable as Disney-Pixar films that have scored Oscar wins for their music."

Strange World's score by Jackman is intended to be the possible contender for Academy Award for Best Original Score at the 95th Academy Awards. However, the film's box-office failure might impact the possibilities of further nominations.

References 

2022 soundtrack albums
Disney animation soundtracks
Walt Disney Records soundtracks
Henry Jackman soundtracks